Ahanta West Municipal District is one of the fourteen districts in Western Region, Ghana. Originally created as an ordinary district assembly in 1988 when it was known as Ahanta West District, which was created from the former Sekondi Takoradi Metropolitan Authority Council, until it was later elevated to municipal district assembly status on 15 March 2018 to become Ahanta West Municipal District. The municipality is located in the southeast part of Western Region and has Agona Nkwanta as its capital town.

Sources
 
 GhanaDistricts.com

References

Districts of the Western Region (Ghana)